Zarrinabad is a city in Zanjan Province, Iran.

Zarrinabad may also refer to:

 Zarrin Rud, a city in Zanjan Province, Iran
 Zarrinabad, Fars, a village
 Zarrinabad, Kerman, a village
 Zarrinabad, Bijar, Kurdistan Province, a village
 Zarrinabad, Qorveh, Kurdistan Province, a village
 Zarrinabad, Lorestan, a village
 Zarrinabad-e Olya, Mazandaran Province, a village
 Zarrinabad-e Sofla, Mazandaran Province, a village
 Zarrinabad, Qazvin, a village
 Zarrinabad, Buin Zahra, Qazvin Province, a village
 Zarrinabad, Semnan, a village
 Zarrinabad, Tehran, a village
 Zarrinabad District, in Ilam Province, Iran